Chakia may mean: 

Chakia, Bihar, a town and a subdivision in East Champaran district of Bihar, India
Chakia, Uttar Pradesh, a town and a tehsil in Chandauli district of Uttar Pradesh, India